The 2007 Iowa State Cyclones football team represented Iowa State University during the 2007 NCAA Division I FBS football season. They played their home games at Jack Trice Stadium in Ames, Iowa. They participated as members of the Big 12 Conference in the North Division. They were coached by head coach Gene Chizik.

Schedule

References

Iowa State
Iowa State Cyclones football seasons
Iowa State Cyclones football